Ayana (full name unknown) is a female Japanese singer-songwriter.

Ayana may also refer to:
 Ayana (given name), a given name (and list of people with that name)
 "Ayana" (short story), a short story by Stephen King
 Ayana (film), a 2018 Indian film
 AYANA - The Aikido Yoshokai Association of North America